Fatehabad is a town in Agra district in the state of Uttar Pradesh, India. It is nearly 35 km south-east of Agra in the direction of Etawah. The historical name of the town is Samugarh.

History 
Fatehabad was founded by the Mughal ruler Aurangzeb after his victory over his brother Dara Shikoh on 29 May 1658. Before the Battle of Samugarh (1658), the town was known as  Samugarh. Aurangzeb's Badshahi Bagh is located around 3 km away from Fatehabad. Later, Fatehabad was the stable of Maratha king Daulatrao Scindia (1794–1827) who ruled over Gwalior.

Geography 
It has an average elevation of 162 metres (534 feet).
Village: Mohanpur is adjacent to Fatehabad about 500 meters towards north on Yamuna road. It is located on SH-2 as well as SH-62. The key features of the town are it have a bypass road and a well maintained road system.

Demographics 
As of 2011 Indian Census, Fatehabad had a total population of 23,278, of which 12,356 were males and 10,922 were females. Population within the age group of 0 to 6 years was 3,478. The total number of literates in Fatehabad was 13,858, which constituted 59.5% of the population with male literacy of 66.1% and female literacy of 52.1%. The effective literacy rate of 7+ population of Fatehabad was 70.0%, of which male literacy rate was 77.7% and female literacy rate was 61.1%. The Scheduled Castes and Scheduled Tribes population was 5,320 and 1 respectively. Fatehabad had 3496 households in 2011.

 India census, Fatehabad had a population of 19,318. Males constitute 54% of the population and females 46%. Fatehabad has an average literacy rate (adult) of 61.72%, higher than the national average of 59.5%; with 70.87% of the males and 50.93% of females literate. A good 16.8% of the population is under 6 years of age.

Politics
Fatehabad (Assembly constituency) represents the area.

Chotelal Verma is currently MLA from here and won because of support of Ram Sakal Gurjar.

Economy 
The major crops grown in the area are :
Wheat, Maize, Potato, Tomato, Onion, Carrot, Louki, Karela, Tinda, Parwal, Mung, Urad, Chana, Rajma and Mustard.Brinjal

References 

Cities and towns in Agra district
1658 establishments in the Mughal Empire

es:Fatehabad